The twenty-first season of the American animated sitcom South Park premiered on Comedy Central on September 13, 2017, and contains ten episodes. This season had planned "dark weeks" (weeks during which no new episodes would air) after episode three, episode six, and episode eight. The season lampooned many events and cultural institutions such as the Trump administration, the Unite the Right rally in Charlottesville, Netflix, the Marvel Cinematic Universe, and themes of self-victimization. The season received mixed to positive reviews, with many reviewers praising the show's ability to remain relevant and choice of abandoning the linear narrative that dominated much of the previous season, despite many of the previous story elements being carried over into this season such as Cartman's relationship with Heidi. The seasons ratings declined overall in comparison to the previous season. The second episode "Put It Down" received an Emmy nomination.

Marketing 
Comedy Central announced on August 22 that the network would be running a marathon of South Park consisting of 254 episodes, all airing over eight days, in a similar vein to The Simpsons 600 episode marathon that aired over 13 days of the previous year. The marathon drew more than 10 million unique viewers to the network. Online across Instagram, Facebook, and Twitter over 7 million video views were generated as well as 500,000 engagements. The stunt helped increase the ratings of other Comedy Central programs as well such as Broad City, which premiered directly after South Park.

Episodes

Reception
The twenty-first season of South Park received mixed reviews. On Rotten Tomatoes, the season holds a 54% approval rating based on 13 reviews, stating "South Park delivers an uncharacteristically stilted season that feels timid in its satire and unsure of who or what it's lampooning."

Jesse Schedeen with IGN rated the entire season an 8.2 out of 10, praising the creators Trey Parker and Matt Stone for shifting away from continuity-heavy storylines and commentary on current events and returning to its roots in absurdity-based situational humor. Schedeen commented, "It's not that this season ignored what was going on in the world this year, but it wasn't quite so obsessed with lampooning current events from week to week. That shift, more than anything else, resulted in a stronger, more well-rounded show."

Home media
This season was released in its entirety on DVD and Blu-ray on June 5, 2018.

References

2017 American television seasons